Delia is a feminine given name. It may also refer to:

Places
 Delia, Alberta, Canada, a village
 Delia, Sicily, Italy, a comune in the Province of Caltanissetta
 Delia, Kansas, United States, a city
 Delia (crater), a minor crater on the moon
 395 Delia, an asteroid

Surname
 Adrian Delia (born 1969), Maltese politician and lawyer
 Carlos César Delía (1923–2014), Argentine Army general and Olympic equestrian
 Collin Delia (born 1994), American ice hockey goaltender
 Marcos Delía (born 1992), Argentine-Italian basketball player
 Delia Matache (born 1982), Romanian singer-songwriter.

Other uses
 Delia (festival), an ancient Greek festival
 Delia (clothing), a historical item of apparel of Polish nobility
 Delia (fly), a genus of flies
 Delia's, a clothing manufacturer and catalogue
 Delia (sonnet cycle) by Samuel Daniel
 The Delia Group of Schools, an education organisation in Hong Kong
 "Delia" (song) a traditional American folk/blues song
 DeLiA, a German literary prize
 Tropical Storm Delia (1973)

See also
 Delias, butterfly genus
 dELiA*s, Inc., a direct marketing and retail company targeting young women aged 13 to 19
 Delian League